Prosper is both a given male name and a surname. Notable people with the name include:

People with the given name
 Prosper of Aquitaine (c. 390–c. 455), also known as Prosper Tiro, Christian saint, writer and disciple of St Augustine
 Prosper of Reggio (died 466), bishop of Reggio Emilia and saint
 Prosper or Prospero Alpini (1553–1617), Venetian physician and botanist
 Prosper Arsenault (1894–1987), Canadian educator and politician
 Prosper Avril (born 1937), President of Haiti from 1988 to 1990
 Prosper Boulanger (1918–2002), Canadian politician and businessman
 Prosper Jolyot de Crébillon (1674–1762), French poet and tragedian
 Prosper Dérivis (1808–1880), French operatic bass
 Prosper Garnot (1794–1838), French surgeon and naturalist
 Prosper Giquel (1835–1886), French naval officer and mercenary in China
 Prosper Guéranger (1805–1875), French Benedictine priest, abbot and founder of the French Benedictine Congregation
 Prosper Henry (1849–1903), French optician and astronomer
 Prosper Higiro (born 1961), Rwandan politician
 Prosper L'Orange (1876–1939), German engineer and inventor
 Prosper de Mestre (1789–1844), businessman in Sydney, Australia
 Prosper Mérimée (1803–1870), French writer
 Prosper Montagné (1865–1948), French chef and author
 Prosper Poullet (1868–1937), Belgian politician
 Prosper Sainton (1813–1890), French violinist and conductor
 Prosper Utseya (born 1985), Zimbabwean cricketer
Prosper Lanchantin-Valmore (1793-1881), French stage actor and second husband of poet Marceline Desbordes-Valmore
 Prosper Weil (born 1926), French lawyer
 "Prosper", codename of Francis Suttill, Special Operations Executive agent in World War II Occupied France

People with the surname
 Lester Prosper (born 1988), Indonesian basketball player
 Peter Prosper (born 1969), Trinidadian footballer
 Pierre-Richard Prosper (born 1963), American lawyer

Fictional characters with the name
 Prosper, fictional orphaned protagonist of the children's novel The Thief Lord by Cornelia Funke

French masculine given names